Glendale is an unincorporated community in Harrison Township, Daviess County, Indiana.

History
A post office was established at Glendale (spelled Glen Dale in early years) in 1866, and remained in operation until it was discontinued in 1907. It was named after Glendale, Ohio.

Geography

References

External links

Unincorporated communities in Daviess County, Indiana
Unincorporated communities in Indiana
1866 establishments in Indiana
Populated places established in 1866